Charles Perceval may refer to:

 Charles Perceval, 7th Earl of Egmont (1845–1897), British peer and politician
 Charles Perceval, 2nd Baron Arden (1756–1840), British politician